This is the progression of world record improvements of the 800 metres W35 division of Masters athletics.

Key

References

Association of Track and Field Statisticians Annuals.

Masters athletics world record progressions